The vice president of Ichkeria was the deputy and the first successor of the President of Ichkeria, replacing the latter in case of death, temporary disability or illness.

Chechen Republic of Ichkeria is a pro-independence movement that controlled most of Chechnya from 1991 to 1999 (see First Chechen War, Second Chechen War). Ichkeria's last presidential elections were held in January 1997.

The Parliament of Chechen Republic of Ichkeria suspended the position of Vice President in November 2007 until next presidential elections.

Vice presidents of Ichkeria

See also
President of Ichkeria
Politics of Chechnya

References

Politicians of Ichkeria
Politics of Chechnya
Chechen Republic of Ichkeria
Chechnya